imc AG is a German software company and supplier of E-Learning content with headquarters in Saarbrücken.

Development

The company imc information multimedia communication AG was founded in 1996 within the Scheer Group of the Saarland, by business informatics professor and former BITKOM President August-Wilhelm Scheer as a spin off to bundle the E-learning business and to expand. The imc AG does not belong to IDS Scheer, which was at that time the third largest German software company after SAP and Software AG and which was sold to Software AG in 2009, but became  a part of the E-learning division within the newly founded Scheer Group GmbH.
August-Wilhelm Scheer is the Head of the Supervisory Board.

In June, 2014, Wolfgang Kraemer, Frank Milius, and Volker Zimmermann, founding Board members, left the company after 17 years. Their Successors were Christian Wachter, Tobias Blickle and Rudolf Keul.
Blickle and Keul left the company in 2017, Christian Wachter is still CEO today. Two more people were appointed to the Board in 2019:

Sven R. Becker was appointed to the Executive Board of imc AG in January 2019 after many years of service for the company. He is responsible for the Marketing & Communication, Sales (Germany, Austria, Switzerland) and Content Services divisions. Dr. Wolfram Jost joined the Executive Board in April 2019 and holds responsibility for the Technology division. He is also CTO at the [Scheer Holding GmbH].

According to MMB ranking, the company is market leader for E-learning software in Germany and, according to own data, the market leader in Europe.
  

The company's main product is a learning management system (abbreviated as LMS, also learning platform). This LMS, called imc Learning Suite, developed by imc is also the technical basis of the 2011 introduced free access MOOCS platform OpenCourseWorld.
First courses were offered in January 2013. By the end of 2013, the MOOCS platform was revised and redesigned. Also, more courses were offered, in particular in the areas of information technology, economics and health care.

In 2014, the IT Journal CHIP placed OpenCourseWorld under the three best MOOCS platforms in the German speaking world together with Coursera and iversity.

2013, the company moved with 170 employees in the new building of the Scheer towers on the University campus North of the University of the Saarland. The red facade made of aluminium of the nine-storey office building is supposed to create associations to the Golden Gate Bridge in San Francisco and the Californian Silicon Valley as the location of IT startups and high-technology.  Other locations are Munich, Freiburg, Essen, Graz (Austria), Zurich (Switzerland), Sibiu (Romania), London (United Kingdom), Singapore and Melbourne (Australia).

In 2021 the company had more than 350 employees worldwide and generated a revenue of €30,7 Million Euro.

Products

In addition to the MOOCS platform OpenCourseWorld and E-learning content, the imc AG sells in particular software products. These include the imc Learning Suite, a learning platform, the authoring software IMC Content Studio, for creating professional E-learning content, the tool imc Express for an easy digitisation of knowledge and the IMC Process Guide, an electronic performance support system (EPSS).
The Educational Software is used among others by the New York Stock Exchange, the British National Health Service and the citizenship test in Austria. The learning platform ranked third among 600 tested programs in the international LMS mid-year ranking of 2014 as the "best software of Germany".

As former Publisher, in addition to several books on management issues, the imc AG first published the journal IM+ioin 2013, merging the journal „IM Information management and consulting“ published since 1986 and the magazine „io“, founded in 1932 and until then issued by the Axel Springer Verlag. Partner is the BWI Center for Industrial Management of ETH Zurich.

References

External links
Website of imc AG

Software companies of Germany
German educational websites
Learning management systems
Companies based in Saarland